Xaver Kurmann (born 29 August 1948) is a retired Swiss amateur cyclist. Had his best results in the individual pursuit event on track, winning two world titles and two Olympic medals between 1968 and 1972, but he also won a bronze medal in the 100 km team time trial at the 1969 UCI Road World Championships.

References

External links
 Database Olympics

1948 births
Living people
People from Hochdorf District
Swiss track cyclists
Swiss male cyclists
Cyclists at the 1968 Summer Olympics
Cyclists at the 1972 Summer Olympics
Olympic cyclists of Switzerland
Olympic silver medalists for Switzerland
Olympic bronze medalists for Switzerland
Olympic medalists in cycling
Medalists at the 1968 Summer Olympics
Medalists at the 1972 Summer Olympics
Sportspeople from the canton of Lucerne